Henrique Halls Rocha da Silva (born 4 February 2002), known as Henrique Halls or just Halls, is a Brazilian footballer who plays as a central defender for Red Bull Bragantino.

Club career
Born in Nova Iguaçu, Rio de Janeiro, Halls played for Vasco da Gama, Nova Iguaçu and Resende as a youth. He made his first team debut for the latter on 24 April 2021, coming on as a late substitute in a 1–3 Campeonato Carioca home loss against Vasco.

On 9 December 2021, Halls renewed his contract until September 2025. The following 10 February, he moved to Red Bull Bragantino, after the club acquired 50% of his economic rights.

Personal life
Halls' older brother, named Hedhe and also known as Halls, is also a footballer. A goalkeeper, he plays for Vasco.

Career statistics

References

External links
Red Bull Bragantino profile 

2002 births
Living people
People from Nova Iguaçu
Brazilian footballers
Association football defenders
Resende Futebol Clube players
Red Bull Bragantino players
Sportspeople from Rio de Janeiro (state)